Oral White (born March 7, 1982, in Grantham, Clarendon, Jamaica W.I.), better known by his performing name Blakkman, is a Jamaican singer-songwriter and DJ. He is best known for his hit singles "Nine Night" and "Hurt Dem"; and his two collaborations with Dexta Daps, "I Miss You So Much" and "Superhero".

Music career 
In 2010 Blakkman joined Bounty Killer's music empire The Alliance as a songwriter. Blakkman wrote several songs for Bounty Killer, including "Rock and Roll" on the Aftershock Riddim, which was used to battle Mavado at Sting. In November 2014 Blakkman recorded his first hit single, "Nine Night", on the Wasp Nest Riddim. In 2015 "Nine Night" became the most requested dubplate in Jamaica and won two major sound Clashes, the Boom Alstar Clash with Fire Links Sound and The Guinness sounds of Greatness with No Limit Sound.

In March 2015 Blakkman signed a recording contract with Island Jams Records. He recorded "Healing", a song produced by Island Jams.

Blakkman has collaborated with notable artists including Beenie Man, Voicemail, Aidonia, and Dexta Daps.

Discography

References 

Living people
1982 births
21st-century Jamaican male singers
Jamaican singer-songwriters